Symbolic is the Voodoo Glow Skulls' fifth full-length album. It was released on September 12, 2000 on Epitaph Records. This album marks the band’s last release on the label. Track 8 “El Mas Chingon” featuring a guitar solo by Reverend Horton Heat.  Track 14 is a cover of the song "I Shot the Sheriff" from Eric Clapton. The song "Say Goodnight" appears on punk compilation album Punk-O-Rama 6.

Track listing

References 

Voodoo Glow Skulls albums
2000 albums
Epitaph Records albums